Backgammon is an erotic mystery film, directed and co-written by Francisco Orvañanos.

Synopsis
Young couple Lucian and Elizabeth arrive at their college friend Andrew's isolated mansion to spend the weekend. Andrew's sister, Miranda, and her boyfriend Gerald, an artist, are also there. Miranda is a playful and seductive character while Gerald enjoys antagonising the others, while frequently arguing with Miranda. After he challenges Lucian to a game of poker, at which the latter loses his possessions, Miranda throws him out, and Lucian must come to terms with his increasing animal attraction to her. Gerald, meanwhile, never truly leaves, but prowls about the grounds laying traps for Lucian.

Cast
 Brittany Allen as Miranda
 Noah Silver as Lucian
 Alex Beh as Gerald
 Olivia Crocicchia as Elizabeth
 Christian Alexander as Andrew

Background
The film is based on the 2009 novella Bloody Baudelaire by R. B. Russell. The screenplay was written by Todd Niemi, R. B. Russell and Francisco Orvañanos, who also co-produced the film with Chris Moore.

The film stars Brittany Allen and Noah Silver. Also appearing in the film are Alex Beh, Christian Alexander and Olivia Crocicchia.

Filmed in the summer of 2012 in Cape Elizabeth, Maine, Backgammon premiered at the Sarasota Film Festival on April 17, 2015. In that same year it was also an official selection of both the Denver Film Festival and the St. Louis International Film Festival.

In 2016 Backgammon was released theatrically on March 11 in Los Angeles and New York, and in Denver on March 25.

Reception
The film has received generally unfavorable reviews from critics. On Rotten Tomatoes  it has a 0% approval rating, based on 6 reviews with an average rating of 2.4/10. On Metacritic it has a score of 22% based on reviews from 5 critics.

References

External links
  
 
 
 

2015 films
2015 psychological thriller films
American psychological drama films
Films based on British novels
2010s English-language films
2010s American films
Backgammon
Films about games